Mariyana Nikolova (born 16 September 1975) is a Bulgarian politician who has been the country's Minister for Tourism since July 2020 and Deputy Prime Minister since November 2018.

Early life and education
Mariyana Nikolova was born on 16 September 1975 in Botevgrad. She has master's degrees in Law from the New Bulgarian University, in Public Administration from Sofia University and in Economic Management from Veliko Tarnovo University.

Career
Nikolova was a lawyer with the Sofia Bar Association and was involved in drafting administrative legislation. She worked for the Ministry for the State Administration and Administrative Reform, Ministry of Agriculture and Food, and Ministry of Economy.

In May 2017, Nikolova became chief of staff to the Deputy Prime Minister for Economic and Demographic Policy. She was also at lecturer at the Public Administration Institute.

On 21 November 2018 Nikolova was elected Deputy Prime Minister for Economic and Demographic Policy by the National Assembly after the resignation of Valeri Simeonov. In August 2019 she took charge of cybersecurity as well. On 24 July 2020, she was also appointed Minister of Tourism, the first time this portfolio has been held at such a high level. She said her task was to ensure the continued functioning of tourism despite travel restrictions related to the COVID-19 pandemic, with a focus on stimulating domestic tourism.

References

External links

 Twitter

Living people
1975 births
New Bulgarian University alumni
Sofia University alumni
Deputy prime ministers of Bulgaria
Women government ministers of Bulgaria
21st-century Bulgarian women politicians
21st-century Bulgarian politicians
People from Botevgrad